Hemichaena is a plant genus in the family Phrymaceae, which was traditionally placed in family Scrophulariaceae.  In the 2012 restructuring of Mimulus by Barker, et al., based largely upon DNA evidence, only seven species were left in Mimulus.

Species
Species include:
 Hemichaena coulteri
 Hemichaena fruticosa
 Hemichaena levigata
 Hemichaena spinulosa
 Hemichaena rugosa

References 

Lamiales genera
Phrymaceae